

Bandy

World Championship
 March 29 – April 4: 2015 Bandy World Championship in  Khabarovsk
  defeated , 5–3, to win their 9th Bandy World Championship title.  took the bronze medal.

World Cup
 October 2014 –  Västerås SK wins the World Cup

International Youth Championships
 23–25 January 2015: U17 World Championship
 Winner:  Russia
 23–25 January 2015: U19 European Championship
 Winner:  Sweden
 25–27 February 2015: G17 World Championship
 Winner:  Sweden

National champions
 Finland: Mikkelin Kampparit (men), Sudet (women)
 Norway: IF Ready (men), Nordre Sande Idrettslag/Drammen Bandy (women)
 Russia: HK Yenisey (men), Zorky Krasnogorsk (women)
 Sweden: Västerås SK (men), Kareby IS (women)
 Ukraine: Dynamo Kharkiv (men)
 United States: Dinkytown Dukes (men)

Bobsleigh and skeleton
 November 9, 2014 – March 8, 2015: 2014–15 FIBT Calendar

FIBT World Cup
 December 8, 2014 – February 15, 2015: 2014–15 Bobsleigh World Cup and 2014–15 Skeleton World Cup together
 December 8–13, 2014: World Cup #1 in  Lake Placid at the Mt. Van Hoevenberg Olympic Bobsled Run
 Two-men bobsleigh winners:  Francesco Friedrich / Thorsten Margis
 Four-men bobsleigh winners:  Maximilian Arndt, Kevin Korona, Joshua Bluhm, and Ben Heber
 Two-women bobsleigh winners:  Elana Meyers / Cherrelle Garrett
 Men's skeleton winner:  Martins Dukurs
 Women's skeleton winner:  Lizzy Yarnold
 December 15–21, 2014: World Cup #2 in  Calgary at the Canada Olympic Park bobsleigh, luge, and skeleton track
 Two-men bobsleigh winners:  Oskars Melbārdis / Daumants Dreiškens
 Four-men bobsleigh winners:  Oskars Melbārdis, Daumants Dreiškens, Arvis Vilkaste, and Jānis Strenga
 Two-women bobsleigh winners:  Elana Meyers / Cherrelle Garrett
 Men's skeleton winner:  Martins Dukurs
 Women's skeleton winner:  Elisabeth Vathje
 January 5–11, 2015: World Cup #3 in  Altenberg at the Altenberg bobsleigh, luge, and skeleton track
 Two-men bobsleigh winners:  Beat Hefti / Alex Baumann
 Four-men bobsleigh winners:  Nico Walther, Andreas Bredau, Marko Hübenbecker, and Christian Poser
 Two-women bobsleigh winners:  Elana Meyers / Cherrelle Garrett
 Men's skeleton winner:  Martins Dukurs
 Women's skeleton winner:  Maria Orlova
 January 12–18, 2015: World Cup #4 in  Königsee at the Königssee bobsleigh, luge, and skeleton track
 Two-men bobsleigh winners:  Beat Hefti / Alex Baumann
 Four-men bobsleigh winners:  Maximilian Arndt, Kevin Korona, Alexander Rödiger, and Ben Heber
 Two-women bobsleigh winners:  Cathleen Martini / Lisa Marie Buckwitz
 Men's skeleton winner:  Aleksandr Tretyakov
 Women's skeleton winner:  Lizzy Yarnold
 January 19–25, 2015: World Cup #5 in  St. Moritz at the St. Moritz-Celerina Olympic Bobrun
 Two-men bobsleigh winners:  Oskars Melbārdis / Daumants Dreiškens
 Four-men bobsleigh winners:  Oskars Melbārdis, Daumants Dreiškens, Arvis Vilkaste, and Jānis Strenga
 Two-women bobsleigh winners:  Anja Schneiderheinze-Stöckel / Annika Drazek
 Men's skeleton winner:  Martins Dukurs
 Women's skeleton winner:  Janine Flock
 January 26 – February 1, 2015: World Cup #6 in  La Plagne at the La Plagne bobsleigh, luge, and skeleton track
 Two-men bobsleigh winners:  Francesco Friedrich / Martin Grothkopp
 Four-men bobsleigh winners:  Oskars Melbārdis / Daumants Dreiškens / Arvis Vilkaste, and Jānis Strenga
 Two-women bobsleigh winners:  Elana Meyers / Cherrelle Garrett
 Men's skeleton winner:  Martins Dukurs
 Women's skeleton: Cancelled.
 February 2–8, 2015: World Cup #7 in  Igls at the Olympic Sliding Centre Innsbruck
 Note: extra women's skeleton event created, due to the cancellation of the event in La Plagne.
 Two-men bobsleigh winners:  Francesco Friedrich / Thorsten Margis
 Four-men bobsleigh winners:  Oskars Melbārdis / Daumants Dreiškens / Arvis Vilkaste, and Jānis Strenga
 Two-women bobsleigh winners:  Elana Meyers / Lauryn Williams
 Men's skeleton winner:  Martins Dukurs
 Women's skeleton winner #1:  Lizzy Yarnold 
 Women's skeleton winner #2:  Lizzy Yarnold 
 February 10–15, 2015: World Cup #8 (final) in  Sochi at the Sliding Center Sanki
 Two-men bobsleigh winners:  Rico Peter / Simon Friedli
 Four-men bobsleigh winners:  Oskars Melbārdis / Daumants Dreiškens / Arvis Vilkaste, and Jānis Strenga
 Two-women bobsleigh winners:  Elana Meyers / Cherrelle Garrett
 Men's skeleton winner:  Aleksandr Tretyakov
 Women's skeleton winner:  Lizzy Yarnold

FIBT World championship
 February 23 – March 8: FIBT World Championships 2015 in  Winterberg at the Winterberg bobsleigh, luge, and skeleton track
 Two-men bobsleigh winners:  Francesco Friedrich / Thorsten Margis
 Four-men bobsleigh winners:  Maximilian Arndt / Alexander Rödiger / Kevin Korona / Ben Heber
 Two-women bobsleigh winners:  Elana Meyers / Cherrelle Garrett
 Men's skeleton winner:  Martins Dukurs
 Women's skeleton winner:  Lizzy Yarnold
 Mixed Bobsleigh/Skeleton Team winners:  Axel Jungk / Cathleen Martini & Lisette Thöne / Tina Hermann / Francesco Friedrich & Martin Grothkopp

Curling

World Curling Tour
 August 22, 2014 – April 18, 2015: 2014–15 World Curling Tour

CCA events
 November 8, 2014 – May 2, 2015: 2014–15 CCA events
 December 3 – 7, 2014: 2014 Canada Cup of Curling in  Camrose
 Men's winner:  Mike McEwen (skip)
 Women's winner:  Valerie Sweeting (skip)
 January 8 – 11: 2015 Continental Cup of Curling in  Calgary
  Team Canada defeated  Team Europe 42–18.
 January 24 – February 1: 2015 Canadian Junior Curling Championships in  Corner Brook
 Men's winner:  Braden Calvert (skip)
 Women's winner:  Kelsey Rocque (skip)
 February 14 – 22: 2015 Scotties Tournament of Hearts in  Moose Jaw
  (Skip: Jennifer Jones) defeated  (Skip: Valerie Sweeting), 6–5, to win her fifth Scotties Tournament of Hearts title. Team Canada (Skip:  Rachel Homan) won the bronze medal.
 February 28 – March 8: 2015 Tim Hortons Brier in  Calgary
 Team  (Skip:  Pat Simmons) defeated  (Skip: Brad Jacobs), 6–5, to defend their Brier title. However, this was the first time there was a Team Canada squad. Also, Alberta won 27 Brier titles in its history.  (Skip: Steve Laycock) took the bronze medal.

Curling Grand Slam

Men's and women's events
 October 28 – November 2, 2014: 2014 The Masters Grand Slam of Curling in  Selkirk
 Men's winner:  Brad Gushue (skip)
 Women's winner:  Valerie Sweeting (skip)
 December 9 – 14, 2014: 2014 Canadian Open of Curling in  Yorkton
 Men's winner:  Brad Gushue (skip)
 Women's winner:  Eve Muirhead (skip)
 April 7 – 12: 2015 Players' Championship in  Toronto
 Men's winner:  Brad Jacobs (skip)
 Women's winner:  Eve Muirhead (skip)

Men's only events
 November 19 – 23, 2014: 2014 The National (November) in  Sault Ste. Marie
  Mike McEwen (skip) defeated  Brad Jacobs (skip), 5–2, to win his first National title.
 March 19 – 22: 2015 Elite 10 in  Fort McMurray (debut event)
  Mike McEwen (skip) defeated  Niklas Edin (skip), 4–2, to win the inaugural Elite 10  title.

Women's only events
 October 10 – 13: 2014 Curlers Corner Autumn Gold Curling Classic in  Calgary
  Jennifer Jones defeated  Rachel Homan, 6–5, to win her third Autumn Gold Curling Classic title.
 November 7 – 10: 2014 Colonial Square Ladies Classic in  Saskatoon
  Team Muirhead defeated  Team Middaugh, 5–4, to win their first Colonial Square Ladies Classic title.

Regional curling events
 September 13 – 20, 2014: 2014 European Mixed Curling Championship in  Tårnby
  (Skip: Patric Mabergs) defeated  (Skip: Steffen Walstad), 9–2, to claim its first European Mixed Curling Championship title.  (Skip: Silvana Tirinzoni) took the bronze medal.
 November 8 – 16, 2014: 2014 Pacific-Asia Curling Championships in  Karuizawa
 Men:  (Skip: Zang Jialiang) defeated  (Skip: Yusuke Morozumi), 7–5, to win China's eighth consecutive Pacific-Asia Curling Championships title.  (Skip: Kim Soo-hyuk) took the bronze medal. 
 Women:  (Skip: Liu Sijia) defeated  (Skip: Kim Eun-jung), 7–6, to win China's seventh Pacific-Asia Curling Championships title.  (Skip: Ayumi Ogasawara) took the bronze medal.
 November 22 – 29, 2014: 2014 European Curling Championships in  Champéry
 Men:  (Skip: Niklas Edin) defeated  (Skip: Thomas Ulsrud), 5–4, to win Sweden's seventh men's European Curling Championships title.  (Skip: Sven Michel) took the bronze medal.
 Women:  (Skip: Binia Feltscher) defeated  (Skip: Anna Sidorova), 8–7, to win Switzerland's sixth women's European Curling Championships title.  (Skip: Eve Muirhead) took the bronze medal.
 January 3 – 9: 2015 European Junior Curling Challenge in  Prague
 Men:  (Skip: Artur Ali) defeated  (Skip: Sergio Vez Labrador), 4–3, to give Russia its first Men's European Junior Curling Challenge title.  (Skip: Enes Taskesen) took the bronze medal.
 Women:  (Skip: Hetty Garnier) defeated  (Skip: Dilşat Yıldız), 9–1, to give England its first Women's European Junior Curling Challenge title.  (Skip: Dorottya Palansca) took the bronze medal.
 January 17 – 24: 2015 Pacific-Asia Junior Curling Championships in  Naseby
 Men:  (Skip: Ki Jeong-lee) defeated  (Skip: Wang Jinbo), 5–4, to win its second men's Pacific-Asia Junior Curling Championship title. 
 Women:  (Skip: Eun Bi-kim) defeated  (Skip: Jiang Yilun), 5–4, to win its second consecutive women's Pacific-Asia Junior Curling Championship title.

World curling championships
 February 7 – 13: 2015 World Wheelchair Curling Championship in  Lohja
  (Skip: Andrey Smirnov) defeated  (Skip: Wang Haitao), 7–4, to win their second World Wheelchair Curling Championship title.  (Skip: Markku Karjalainen) won the bronze medal.
 February 28 – March 8: 2015 World Junior Curling Championships in  Tallinn
 Men:  (Skip:  Braden Calvert) defeated  (Skip: Yannick Schwaller), 6–3, to win Canada's 18th World Junior Curling Championships title.  (Skip: Bruce Mouat) took the bronze medal.
 Women:  (Skip:  Kelsey Rocque) defeated  (Skip: Gina Aitken), 8–2, to win Canada's 10th World Junior Curling Championships women's title.  (Skip: Lisa Gisler) took the bronze medal.
 March 14 – 22: 2015 World Women's Curling Championship in  Sapporo
  (Skip: Alina Pätz) defeated  (Skip: Jennifer Jones), 5–3, to win Switzerland's fifth World Women's Curling Championship title.  (Skip: Anna Sidorova) won the bronze medal.
 March 28 – April 5: 2015 Ford World Men's Curling Championship in  Halifax
  (Skip: Niklas Edin) defeated  (Skip: Thomas Ulsrud), 9–5, to claim the country's seventh World Men's Curling Championship title.  (Skip: Pat Simmons) took the bronze medal.
 April 18 – 25: 2015 World Mixed Doubles Curling Championship and the 2015 World Senior Curling Championships in  Sochi
 Men's Seniors: The  (Skip: Lyle Sieg) defeated  (Skip: Alan O'Leary), 9–4, to win the USA's third Men's Seniors title.  (Skip: Hans Frauenlob) won the bronze medal.
 Women's Seniors:  (Skip: Lois Fowler) defeated  (Skip: Fiona Grace Simpson), 6–2, to win Canada's tenth Women's Seniors title. The  (Skip: Norma O'Leary) won the bronze medal.
 Mixed Doubles:  Dorottya Palancsa / Zsolt Kiss defeated  Camilla Johansson / Per Noréen, 6–5, to win Hungary's second Mixed Doubles title.  Kristin Skaslien / Magnus Nedregotten won the bronze medal.

Figure skating

Senior Grand Prix
 October 24 – December 14: 2014–15 ISU Grand Prix of Figure Skating
 October 24 – 26: 2014 Skate America in  Hoffman Estates, Illinois
 Men:  Tatsuki Machida
 Ladies:  Elena Radionova
 Pairs:  Yuko Kavaguti / Alexander Smirnov
 Ice dance:  Madison Chock / Evan Bates
 October 31 – November 2: 2014 Skate Canada International in  Kelowna
 Men:  Takahito Mura
 Ladies:  Anna Pogorilaya
 Pairs:  Meagan Duhamel / Eric Radford
 Ice dance:  Kaitlyn Weaver / Andrew Poje
 November 7 – 9: 2014 Cup of China in  Shanghai
 Men:  Maxim Kovtun
 Ladies:  Elizaveta Tuktamysheva
 Pairs:  Peng Cheng / Zhang Hao
 Ice dance:  Gabriella Papadakis / Guillaume Cizeron
 November 14 – 16: 2014 Rostelecom Cup in  Moscow
 Men:  Javier Fernández
 Ladies:  Rika Hongo
 Pairs:  Ksenia Stolbova / Fedor Klimov
 Ice dance:  Madison Chock / Evan Bates
 November 21 – 23: 2014 Trophée Éric Bompard in  Bordeaux
 Men:  Maxim Kovtun
 Ladies:  Elena Radionova
 Pairs:  Ksenia Stolbova / Fedor Klimov
 Ice dance:  Gabriella Papadakis / Guillaume Cizeron
 November 28 – 30: 2014 NHK Trophy in  Osaka
 Men:  Daisuke Murakami
 Ladies:  Gracie Gold
 Pairs:  Meagan Duhamel / Eric Radford
 Ice dance:  Kaitlyn Weaver / Andrew Poje
 December 11 – 14: 2014–15 Grand Prix of Figure Skating Final in  Barcelona
 Men:  Yuzuru Hanyu
 Ladies:  Elizaveta Tuktamysheva
 Pairs:  Meagan Duhamel / Eric Radford
 Ice dance:  Kaitlyn Weaver / Andrew Poje

Junior Grand Prix
 August 20, 2014 – December 14, 2014: 2014–15 ISU Junior Grand Prix
 August 20 – 24 in  Courchevel
 Men's winner:  Lee June-hyoung
 Ladies' winner:  Evgenia Medvedeva
 Ice dance winners:  Alla Loboda / Pavel Drozd
 Note: No pairs event for this Grand Prix #1
 August 27 – 31 in  Ljubljana
 Men's winner:  JIN Boyang
 Ladies' winner:  Serafima Sakhanovich
 Ice dance winners:  Daria Morozova / Mikhail Zhirnov
 Note: Like GP#1, there was no pairs competition in this Grand Prix #2
 September 3 – 7 in  Ostrava
 Men's winner:  Roman Sadovsky
 Ladies' winner:  Evgenia Medvedeva
 Pairs winners:  Julianne Séguin / Charlie Bilodeau
 Ice dance winners:  Mackenzie Bent / Garrett MacKeen
 September 10 – 14 in  Nagoya, Aichi Prefecture
 Men's winner:  JIN Boyang
 Ladies' winner:  Serafima Sakhanovich
 Ice dance winners:  Madeline Edwards / PANG Zhaokai
 Note: Again, no pairs competition was contested in this Grand Prix #4
 September 24 – 28 in  Tallinn
 Men's winner:  Alexander Petrov
 Ladies' winner:  Miyu Nakashio
 Pairs winners:  Maria Vigalova / Egor Zakroev
 Ice dance winners:  Anna Yanovskaya / Sergey Mozgov
 October 1 – 5 in  Dresden
 Men's winner:  Andrei Lazukin
 Ladies' winner:  Wakaba Higuchi
 Pairs winners:  Julianne Séguin / Charlie Bilodeau
 Ice dance winners:  Betina Popova / Yuri Vlasenko
 October 8 – 12 in  Zagreb
 Men's winner:  Shoma Uno
 Ladies' winner:  Maria Sotskova
 Pairs winners:  Maria Vigalova / Egor Zakroev
 Ice dance winners:  Anna Yanovskaya / Sergey Mozgov
 December 11 – 14 in  Barcelona (final and part of the Grand Prix Final)
 Men's winner:  Shoma Uno
 Ladies' winner:  Evgenia Medvedeva
 Pairs winners:  Julianne Séguin / Charlie Bilodeau
 Ice dance winners:  Anna Yanovskaya / Sergey Mozgov

World and regional FS championships
 January 26 – February 1: 2015 European Figure Skating Championships in  Stockholm
 Men's winner:  Javier Fernández
 Ladies winner:  Elizaveta Tuktamysheva
 Pairs winners:  Yuko Kavaguti / Alexander Smirnov
 Ice Dance winners:  Gabriella Papadakis / Guillaume Cizeron
 February 9 – 15: 2015 Four Continents Figure Skating Championships in  Seoul
 Men's winner:  Denis Ten
 Ladies winner:  Polina Edmunds
 Pairs winners:  Meagan Duhamel / Eric Radford
 Ice Dance winners:  Kaitlyn Weaver / Andrew Poje
 March 2 – 8: 2015 World Junior Figure Skating Championships in  Tallinn
 Men's winner:  Shoma Uno
 Ladies winner:  Evgenia Medvedeva
 Pairs winners:  Yu Xiaoyu / Jin Yang
 Ice Dance winners:  Anna Yanovskaya / Sergey Mozgov
 March 23 – 29: 2015 World Figure Skating Championships in  Shanghai
 Men's winner:  Javier Fernández
 Ladies winner:  Elizaveta Tuktamysheva
 Pairs winners:  Meagan Duhamel / Eric Radford
 Ice Dance winners:  Gabriella Papadakis / Guillaume Cizeron
 April 16 – 19: 2015 ISU World Team Trophy in Figure Skating in  Tokyo
 Winners:  (Max Aaron, Jason Brown, Gracie Gold, Ashley Wagner, Alexa Scimeca/Chris Knierim, Madison Chock/Evan Bates)

Ice hockey

National Hockey League
 October 8, 2014 – April 11, 2015: 2014–15 NHL season
 Presidents' Trophy team winners:  New York Rangers
 Art Ross Trophy (top scorer) winner:  Jamie Benn  Dallas Stars
 Hart Memorial Trophy (season MVP) winner:  Carey Price  Montreal Canadiens
 January 1: 2015 NHL Winter Classic at Nationals Park in  Washington, D.C.
 The  Washington Capitals defeated the  Chicago Blackhawks 3–2.
 January 25: 60th National Hockey League All-Star Game at Nationwide Arena in  Columbus, Ohio
 Team Toews defeated Team Foligno, 17–12, in the highest-scoring All-Star Game in history. The MVP of this All-Star Game was  Ryan Johansen, of the  Columbus Blue Jackets.
 February 21: 2015 NHL Stadium Series at Levi's Stadium in  Santa Clara, California
 The Los Angeles Kings defeated the San Jose Sharks 2–1.
 April 15 – June 15: 2015 Stanley Cup playoffs
 The  Chicago Blackhawks defeated the  Tampa Bay Lightning, 4–2 in games played, to win their sixth Stanley Cup title. 
 June 26 & 27: 2015 NHL Entry Draft at the BB&T Center in  Sunrise
 #1 pick:  Connor McDavid (to the  Edmonton Oilers from the  Erie Otters)

Kontinental Hockey League
 September 3, 2014 – February 24, 2015: 2014–15 KHL season
 Continental Cup winner:  HC CSKA Moscow
 KHL Regular Season Top Scorer:  Alexander Radulov (HC CSKA Moscow)
 January 25: 2015 Kontinental Hockey League All-Star Game at the Bolshoy Ice Dome in  Sochi
 Team East (Coach:  Mike Keenan) defeated Team West (Coach:  Dmitri Kvartalnov), 18–16.
 February 27 – April 19: 2015 Gagarin Cup playoffs
  SKA Saint Petersburg defeated the  Ak Bars Kazan, 4–1 in matches played, to win their first Gagarin Cup title.

Other ice hockey championships
 December 26 – 31, 2014: 2014 Spengler Cup in  Davos
 The  Genève-Servette HC defeated the  HC Salavat Yulaev Ufa in the final, 3–0, to win their second title.
 December 26, 2014 – January 5, 2015: 2015 World Junior Ice Hockey Championship in  Toronto and Montreal (final at the Air Canada Centre)
  defeated , 5–4, to win its 16th World Junior Ice Hockey Championship title.  took the bronze medal.
 January 5 – 12: 2015 IIHF World Women's U18 Championship in  Buffalo, New York
 The  defeated , 3–2 in overtime, to win their fourth IIHF World Women's U18 Championships title.  took the bronze medal.
 March 14 — 15: 2015 CIS University Cup in Halifax, Nova Scotia
 The University of Alberta Golden Bears defeated the University of New Brunswick Varsity Reds 6–3 to win their second consecutive CIS University Cup.
 March 20 – 22: 2015 NCAA National Collegiate Women's Ice Hockey Tournament Frozen Four at Ridder Arena in  Minneapolis
 The  Minnesota Golden Gophers defeated the  Harvard Crimson, 4–1, to win their fifth NCAA National Collegiate Women's Ice Hockey title.
 March 28 – April 4: 2015 IIHF Women's World Championship in  Malmö
 The  defeated , 7–5, to win their sixth IIHF Women's World Championship title.  took the bronze medal.
 April 9 & 11: 2015 NCAA Division I Men's Ice Hockey Tournament Frozen Four at TD Garden in  Boston
 The  Providence Friars defeated the  Boston University Terriers, 4–3, to win their first NCAA Division I Men's Ice Hockey Tournament title.
 April 13 – 18: 2015 Allan Cup in  Clarenville, Newfoundland and Labrador
 The  South East Prairie Thunder defeated the  Bentley Generals, 2–0, to win their second Allan Cup title.
 April 16 – 26: 2015 IIHF World U18 Championships in  Zug and Lucerne
 The  defeated , 2–1 in overtime, to win their ninth IIHF World U18 Championships title.  won the bronze medal.
 April 24 – May 3: 2015 IPC Ice Sledge Hockey World Championships in  Buffalo
 The  defeated , 3–0, to win their third IPC Ice Sledge Hockey World Championships title.  won the bronze medal.
 May 1 – 17: 2015 IIHF World Championship in  Prague and Ostrava
  defeated , 6–1, to win their 25th IIHF World Championship title. The  took the bronze medal.
 May 22 – 31: 2015 Memorial Cup in  Quebec City
 The  Oshawa Generals defeated the  Kelowna Rockets, 2–1, to win their fifth Memorial Cup title.

Luge

Seniors World Cup
 November 29, 2014 – March 1, 2015: 2014–15 Luge World Cup Schedule
 November 29 & 30, 2014: World Cup #1 in  Igls
 Men's Individual winner:  Felix Loch
 Men's Doubles winners:  Toni Eggert & Sascha Benecken
 Women's Individual winner:  Natalie Geisenberger
 December 5 & 6, 2014: World Cup #2 in  Lake Placid, New York
 Men's Individual winner:  Tucker West
 Men's Doubles winners:  Toni Eggert & Sascha Benecken
 Women's Individual winner:  Natalie Geisenberger
 December 12 & 13, 2014: World Cup #3 in  Calgary
 Men's Individual winner:  Samuel Edney
 Men's Doubles winners:  Toni Eggert & Sascha Benecken
 Women's Individual winner:  Natalie Geisenberger
 January 3 & 4: World Cup #4 in  Königssee
 Men's Individual winner:  Felix Loch
 Men's Doubles winners:  Tobias Wendl & Tobias Arlt
 Women's Individual winner:  Natalie Geisenberger
 January 17 & 18: World Cup #5 in  Oberhof
 Men's Individual winner:  Felix Loch
 Men's Doubles winners:  Tobias Wendl & Tobias Arlt
 Women's Individual winner:  Natalie Geisenberger
 January 24 & 25: World Cup #6 in  Winterberg
 Men's Individual winner:  Felix Loch
 Men's Doubles winners:  Toni Eggert & Sascha Benecken
 Women's Individual winner:  Natalie Geisenberger
 January 31 & February 1: World Cup #7 in  Lillehammer
 Men's Individual winner:  Wolfgang Kindl
 Men's Doubles winners:  Tobias Wendl & Tobias Arlt
 Women's Individual winner:  Tatiana Ivanova
 February 21 & 22: World Cup #8 in  Altenberg, Saxony
 Men's Individual winner:  Felix Loch
 Men's Doubles winners:  Tobias Wendl & Tobias Arlt
 Women's Individual winner:  Natalie Geisenberger
 February 28 & March 1: World Cup #9 (final) in  Sochi
 Men's Individual winner:  Semen Pavlichenko
 Men's Doubles winners:  Tobias Wendl & Tobias Arlt
 Women's Individual winner:  Dajana Eitberger

Juniors World Cup
 December 4, 2014 – February 7, 2015: 2014–15 Junior Luge World Cup Schedule
 December 4 & 5, 2014: Junior World Cup #1 in  Whistler
 Men's Individual winner:  Alexander Ferlazzo
 Men's Doubles winners:  Stanislav Maltsev & Oleg Faskhutdinov
 Women's Individual winner:  Jessica Tiebel
 December 6 & 7, 2014: Junior World Cup #2 in  Whistler
 Men's Individual winner:  Sebastian Bley
 Men's Doubles winners:  Nico Semmler & Johannes Pfeiffer
 Women's Individual winner:  Julia Taubitz
 Team Sprint winners:  (Victoria Demchenko, Roman Repilov, Evgeny Evdokimov & Alexey Groshev)
 December 15 & 16, 2014: Junior World Cup #3 in  Park City, Utah
 Men's Individual winner:  Roman Repilov
 Men's Doubles winners:  Stanislav Maltsev & Oleg Faskhutdinov
 Women's Individual winner:  Jessica Tiebel
 Team winners:  (Victoria Demchenko, Roman Repilov, and Stanislav Maltsev & Oleg Faskhutdinov)
 January 24 & 25: Junior World Cup #4 in  Oberhof
 Men's Individual winner:  Sebastian Bley
 Men's Doubles winners:  Florian Löffler & Manuel Stiebing
 Women's Individual winner:  Jessica Tiebel
 Team Sprint winners:  (Victoria Demchenko, Roman Repilov, Evgeny Evdokimov & Alexey Groshev)
 January 30 & 31: Junior World Cup #5 in  Igls
 Men's Individual winner:  Theo Gruber
 Women's Individual winner:  Julia Taubitz
 Men's Doubles winners:  David Trojer & Philip Knoll
 Team winners:  (Katrin Heinzelmaier, Nico Gleirscher, David Trojer & Philip Knoll)
 February 6 & 7: Junior World Cup #6 (final) in  Winterberg
 Men's Individual winner:  Sebastian Bley
 Women's Individual winner:  Madeleine Egle
 Men's Doubles winners:  David Trojer & Philip Knoll
 Team winners:  (Saskia Langer, Sebastian Bley, Florian Löffler & Manuel Stiebing)

Sprint Cup
 November 29, 2014 – February 22, 2015: 2014–15 Luge Sprint Cup Schedule
 November 29 & 30, 2014: In conjunction with the first World Cup in 
 Men's winner:  Felix Loch
 Women's winner:  Natalie Geisenberger
 Doubles winners:  Toni Eggert & Sascha Benecken
 December 12 & 13, 2014: In conjunction with the third World Cup in 
 Men's winner:  Chris Mazdzer
 Women's winner:  Alex Gough
 Doubles winners:  Tobias Wendl & Tobias Arlt
 Men's winner:  Felix Loch
 Women's winner:  Erin Hamlin
 Doubles winners:  Toni Eggert & Sascha Benecken

Team Relay World Cup
 December 5, 2014 – March 1, 2015: 2014–15 Team relay World Cup Schedule
 December 5 & 6, 2014: In conjunction with the second World Cup in the 
 Winners:  (Natalie Geisenberger, Felix Loch, and Toni Eggert & Sascha Benecken)
 January 3 & 4: In conjunction with the fourth World Cup in 
 Winners:  (Natalie Geisenberger, Felix Loch, and Tobias Wendl & Tobias Arlt)
 January 17 & 18: In conjunction with the fifth World Cup in Germany
 Winners:  (Natalie Geisenberger, Felix Loch, and Tobias Wendl & Tobias Arlt)
 January 24 & 25: In conjunction with the sixth World Cup in Germany
 Winners:  (Natalie Geisenberger, Felix Loch, and Toni Eggert & Sascha Benecken)
 January 31 & February 1: In conjunction with the seventh World Cup in 
 Winners:  (Dajana Eitberger, Felix Loch, and Tobias Wendl & Tobias Arlt)
 Winners:  (Dajana Eitberger, Felix Loch, and Tobias Wendl & Tobias Arlt)

World and regional luge championships
 January 16 & 17: 2015 FIL Junior World Championships in  Lillehammer
 Men's winner:  Roman Repilov
 Women's winner:  Jessica Tiebel
 Men's Doubles winners:  Florian Loeffler / Manuel Stiebing
 Team Relay winners:  Ulla Zirne, Kristers Aparjods, and Kristens Putins & Karlis Kriss Matuzels
 January 24 & 25: 2015 Junior European Luge Championships in  Oberhof
 Men's winner:  Sabastian Bley
 Women's winner:  Jessica Tiebel
 Men's Doubles winners:  Florian Loeffler / Manuel Stiebing
 Team Relay winners:  Victoria Demchenko, Roman Repilov, Evgeny Evdokimov & Alexei Groshev
 February 14 & 15: 2015 FIL World Luge Championships in  Sigulda
 Men's winner:  Semen Pavlichenko
 Women's winner:  Natalie Geisenberger
 Men's Doubles winners:  Tobias Wendl / Tobias Arlt
 Mixed Team Relay winners:  Natalie Geisenberger, Felix Loch, Tobias Wendl & Tobias Arlt
 Men's Under-23 winner:  Aleksander Peretyagin
 Women's Under-23 Singles winner:  Ekaterina Katnikova
 Men's Under-23 Doubles winners  Andrey Bogdanov / Andrey Medvedev
 February 28 & March 1: 2015 FIL European Luge Championships in  Sochi
 Men's Individual winner:  Semen Pavlichenko
 Men's Doubles winners:  Tobias Wendl & Tobias Arlt
 Women's Individual winner:  Dajana Eitberger
 Team Relay winners:  Dajana Eitberger, Felix Loch, Tobias Wendl & Tobias Arlt

Speed skating

Long track speed skating

LT World Cup
 November 14, 2014 – March 22, 2015: 2014–15 ISU Speed Skating World Cup
 November 14 – 16, 2014, in  Obihiro
 The  won both the gold and overall medal tallies.
 November 21 – 23, 2014, in  Seoul
  won the gold medal tally. The  won the overall medal tally.
 December 5 – 7, 2014, in  Berlin
 The  won both the gold and overall medal tallies.
 December 12 – 14, 2014, in  Heerenveen (#1)
The Netherlands won the overall medal tally.
 January 31 & February 1 in  Hamar
 The  won both the gold and overall medal tallies.
 February 7 & 8 in  Heerenveen (#2)
 The  won the gold medal tally. The  and the United States won 5 overall medals each.
 March 21 & 22 in  Erfurt (final)
 The  won the gold medal tally. The  won the overall medal tally.
 Men's overall winner:  Pavel Kulizhnikov
 Women's overall winner:  Heather Richardson

LT Junior World Cup
 November 22, 2014 – February 15, 2015: 2014–15 ISU Junior World Cup Speed Skating
 November 22 & 23, 2014, in  Calgary
  won both the gold and overall medal tallies.
 December 13 & 14, 2014, in  Minsk
 The  won both the gold and overall medal tallies.
 January 10 & 11 in  Changchun
  won both the gold and overall medal tallies.
 January 17 & 18 in  Collalbo
 The  won both the gold and overall medal tallies.
 February 14 & 15 in  Warsaw (final)
 The  won both the gold and overall medal tallies.

Long track speed skating championships
 January 10 & 11: 2015 Asian Single Distance Speed Skating Championships in  Changchun
 Men's 500m winner #1:  Sung Ching-yang
 Men's 500m #2 and overall winner:  Sung Ching-yang
 Women's 500m winner #1:  Zhang Hong
 Women's 500m #2 and overall winner:  Zhang Hong
 Men's 1000m winner:  LI Bailin 
 Women's 1000m winner:  Zhang Hong
 Men's 1500m winner:  LI Bailin 
 Women's 1500m winner:  Li Qishi
 Men's 5000m winner:  Sun Longjiang
 Women's 3000m winner:  Zhao Xin
 Men's 10,000m winner:  Sun Longjiang
 Women's 5000m winner:  HAO Jiachen 
 January 10 & 11: 2015 European Speed Skating Championships in  Chelyabinsk
 Men's 500m winner:  Koen Verweij
 Women's 500m winner:  Ireen Wüst
 Men's 1500m winner:  Denis Yuskov
 Women's 1500m winner:  Ireen Wüst
 Men's 5000m winner:  Sven Kramer
 Women's 3000m winner:  Martina Sábliková
 Men's 10,000m winner:  Sven Kramer
 Women's 5000m winner:  Martina Sábliková
 February 12 – 15: 2015 World Single Distance Speed Skating Championships in  Heerenveen
 Men's 500m winner #1:  Pavel Kulizhnikov
 Men's 500m #2 winner and overall winner:  Pavel Kulizhnikov
 Women's 500m winner #1:  Heather Richardson
 Women's 500m #2 winner and overall winner:  Heather Richardson
 Men's 1000m winner:  Shani Davis
 Women's 1000m winner:  Brittany Bowe
 Men's 1500m winner:  Denis Yuskov
 Women's 1500m winner:  Brittany Bowe
 Men's 5000m winner:  Sven Kramer
 Women's 3000m winner:  Martina Sábliková
 Men's 10,000m winner:  Jorrit Bergsma
 Women's 5000m winner:  Martina Sábliková
 Men's Team Pursuit winners:  (Sven Kramer, Koen Verweij, Douwe de Vries, Wouter olde Heuvel)
 Women's Team Pursuit winners:  (Ayaka Kikuchi, Miho Takagi, Nana Takagi, Maki Tabata)
 Men's Mass Start winner:  Arjan  Stroetinga
 Women's Mass Start winner:  Irene Schouten
 February 20 – 22: 2015 World Junior Speed Skating Championships in  Warsaw
 Men's Junior 500m winner:  Kim Jun-ho
 Women's Junior 500m winner:  Vanessa Bittner
 Men's Junior 1000m winner:  FAN Yang
 Women's Junior 1000m winner:  Vanessa Bittner
 Men's Junior 1500m winner:  Patrick Roest
 Women's Junior 1500m winner:  Melissa Wijfje
 Men's Junior 5000m winner:  Nils van der Poel
 Women's Junior 3000m winner:  Melissa Wijfje
 Men's Junior Team Sprint winners:  YANG Seung-yong / KIM Jun-ho / KIM Min-seok
 Women's Junior Team Sprint winners:  KIM Min-sun / JANG Mi / PARK Cho-won
 Men's Junior Team Pursuit winners:  Marcel Bosker / Wesly Dijs / Patrick Roest
 Women's Junior Team Pursuit winners:  Sanneke de Neeling / Esmée Visser / Melissa Wijfje
 Men's Junior Mass Start winner:  OH Hyun-min 
 Women's Junior Mass Start winner:  Vanessa Bittner
 Men's Junior All Round winner:  Patrick Roest
 Women's Junior All Round winner:  Melissa Wijfje
 February 28 & March 1: 2015 World Sprint Speed Skating Championships in  Astana
 Men's overall winner:  Pavel Kulizhnikov
 Women's overall winner:  Brittany Bowe
 March 7 – 8: 2015 World Allround Speed Skating Championships in  Calgary
 Men's overall winner:  Sven Kramer
 Women's overall winner:  Martina Sáblíková

Short track speed skating

ST World Cup
 November 7, 2014 – February 15, 2015: 2014–15 ISU Short Track Speed Skating World Cup
 November 7 – 9, 2014, in  Salt Lake City
 Men: Both  and  won 2 gold and 4 overall medals each.
 Women:  won both the gold and overall medal tallies.
 November 14 – 16, 2014, in  Montreal
 Men:  won both the gold and overall medal tallies.
 Women:  won both the gold and overall medal tallies.
 December 12 – 14, 2014, in  Shanghai
 Men:  won the gold medal tally.  won the overall medal tally.
 Women:  won both the gold and overall medal tallies.
 December 19 – 21, 2014, in  Seoul
 Men: Host nation, won both the gold and overall medal tallies.
 Women: Host nation, and  won 3 gold medals each. South Korea won the overall medal tally.
 February 6 – 8 in  Dresden
 Men:  won the gold medal tally.  and Russia won 4 overall medals each.
 Women:  won the gold and overall medal tallies.
 February 13 – 15 in  Erzurum (final)
 Men:  won the gold and overall medal tallies.
 Women:  and  won 2 gold medals each.  won the overall medal tally.

Short track speed skating championships
 January 23 – 25: 2015 European Short Track Speed Skating Championships in  Dordrecht
 Overall men's winner:  Sjinkie Knegt
 Overall women's winner:  Elise Christie
 Men's medal tally: The  and  won 2 gold medals each. Russia won the overall medal tally.
 Women's medal tally:  and  won 2 gold medals each. Russia won the overall medal tally.
 February 27 – March 1: 2015 World Junior Short Track Speed Skating Championships in  Osaka
 Men's Junior 500m winner:  KIM Da-gyeom 
 Women's Junior 500m winner:  SON Ha-kyung 
 Men's Junior 1000m winner:  KIM Da-gyeom 
 Women's Junior 1000m winner:  KIM Ji-yoo 
 Men's Junior 1500m winner:  PARK Ji-won
 Women's Junior 1500m winner:  Kong Sang-jeong
 Men's Junior 3000m Relay winners:  PARK Ji-won / KIM Da-gyeom / LIM Yong-jin / YOON Sumin
 Women's Junior 3000m Relay winners:  SON Ha-kyung / KIM Ji-yoo / Kong Sang-jeong / LEE Suyoun 
 Men's Junior Overall winner:  KIM Da-gyeom 
 Women's Junior Overall winner:  Kong Sang-jeong
 March 13 – 15: 2015 World Short Track Speed Skating Championships in  Moscow
 Men's 500m winner:  Wu Dajing
 Women's 500m winner:  Fan Kexin
 Men's 1000m winner:  Park Se-yeong
 Women's 1000m winner:  Choi Min-jeong
 Men's 1500m winner:  Semion Elistratov
 Women's 1500m winner:  Arianna Fontana
 Men's 3000m winner:  Sjinkie Knegt
 Women's 3000m winner:  Choi Min-jeong
 Men's 5000m Team Relay winners:  (Wu Dajing, Chen Dequan, Xu Hongzhi, Han Tianyu)
 Women's 3000m Team Relay winners:  (Noh Do Hee, Shim Suk-hee, Kim A-lang, Choi Min-jeong)
 Men's overall winner:  Sjinkie Knegt
 Women's overall winner:  Choi Min-jeong

See also
 2015 in athletics (track and field)
 2015 in skiing
 2015 in sports

References

External links
 Federation of International Bandy
 The International Bobsleigh and Skeleton Federation
 World Curling Federation
 International Skating Union
 International Ice Hockey Federation
 International Luge Federation

Ice sports
Ice sports by year
Ice sports